Rhombotrypa is an extinct trepostome bryozoan genus from the Ordovician Period, first described in 1866 by Carl Ludwig Rominger. Rhombotrypa quadrata is one of the few trepostome bryozoans known from the Cincinnatian that can be recognized externally, without analyzing the internal structure of the fossils.

References

Prehistoric bryozoan genera
Ordovician genera
Ordovician bryozoans
Trepostomata